Branded is a 1931 American Pre-Code Western film directed by D. Ross Lederman.

Plot
Dale (Buck Jones) and sidekick 'Swede' (John Oscar) break up a stage robbery only to be arrested for the robbery. Escaping to a new town they make an enemy of Moore (Albert J. Smith).

Cast
 Buck Jones as Cuthbert Chauncy Dale
 Ethel Kenyon as Lou Preston
 Wallace MacDonald as Stage Robber (as Wallace McDonald)
 Philo McCullough as Mac - Fall City Sheriff
 Albert J. Smith as Joe Moore (as Al Smith)
 John Oscar as Ole 'Swede' Swenson
 Clark Burroughs as Mr. Preston
 Fred Burns as Prestonville Sheriff

References

External links
 
 
 
 

1931 films
1931 Western (genre) films
American Western (genre) films
1930s English-language films
American black-and-white films
Films directed by D. Ross Lederman
Columbia Pictures films
1930s American films